Back in Action is an upcoming action comedy film directed by Seth Gordon from a screenplay he co-wrote with Brendan O'Brien, and starring Jamie Foxx, Cameron Diaz (in her first film since 2014’s Annie), Kyle Chandler, and Glenn Close. The film is set to be released on the streaming service Netflix.

Cast
 Jamie Foxx
 Cameron Diaz
 Glenn Close
 Kyle Chandler
 Andrew Scott
 Jamie Demetriou
 McKenna Roberts
 Rylan Jackson

Production
In June 2022, it was reported that Cameron Diaz was coming out of retirement for a Seth Gordon and  Brendan O'Brien penned action comedy entitled Back in Action, also set to star Jamie Foxx. Beau Bauman was revealed to be producing for Good One Productions with Seth Gordon producing for Exhibit A and Foxx, Datari Turner, O'Brien and Mark McNair executive producing. In August 2022, Foxx spoke about persuading Diaz out of retirement to make her first film since 2014, telling Entertainment Tonight that "Cameron is such an incredible force and she has done so much in this business" and that he asked her "'Do you wanna have some fun? Just have some fun!' And I think that's what brought her to it...we're so happy that it's happening and looking forward to it".

In November 2022, Glenn Close and Kyle Chandler were added to the cast. In February 2023, Andrew Scott,  McKenna Roberts, Rylan Jackson and Jamie Demetriou joined the cast.

Filming
Principal photography began in December 2022 in London, England. In late February 2023, Diaz shot scenes at the River Thames. Filming wrapped that same month.

References

External links

Upcoming films
2020s English-language films
2020s action comedy films
American action comedy films
Chernin Entertainment films
English-language Netflix original films
Upcoming Netflix original films
Films shot in London
Films produced by Peter Chernin